Pins and Needles is a 1937 musical revue.

Pins and Needles may also refer to:

 Pins and needles or paresthesia, a physical sensation of tingling, pricking, or numbness
 Pins and Needles (Birthday Massacre album), or the title song, 2010
 Pins and Needles (Chris Caffery album), or the title song, 2007
 "Pins and Needles" (song), by Opshop

See also
 Needles and Pins (disambiguation)